Outside agitator is a term that has been used to discount political unrest as being driven by outsiders, rather than by internal discontent. The term was popularized during the early stages of the Civil Rights Movement in the United States, when Southern authorities discounted African-American protests as being driven by Northern white radicals, rather than being legitimate expressions of grievances. 

The term gained further prominence during the George Floyd protests, with local officials in Minneapolis claiming that most protesters were not from the city, despite jail records and social media indicating otherwise.The term was also used during the Ferguson unrest in 2014.

See also

 Third Force (South Africa)

References

Civil rights movement
Political terminology of the United States